Eno is a 1973 documentary short film directed by Alfons Sinniger. The subject of the film is musician Brian Eno (shortly after his departure from Roxy Music), and features the recording sessions for Eno's record Here Come the Warm Jets.

References

External links
 
 
 http://dangerousminds.net/comments/here_comes_the_collapsed_lung_brian_eno

1973 films
1973 documentary films
1973 short films
Documentary films about electronic music and musicians
1970s short documentary films
1970s English-language films